Defending champions Stéphane Houdet and Shingo Kunieda defeated Maikel Scheffers and Ronald Vink in the final, 5–7, 6–0, 6–3 to win the gentlemen's doubles wheelchair tennis title at the 2014 Wimbledon Championships. It was Houdet's third step towards a Grand Slam.

Seeds

  Stéphane Houdet /  Shingo Kunieda (champions)
  Maikel Scheffers /  Ronald Vink (final)

Draw

Finals

References
Draw

Men's Wheelchair Doubles
Wimbledon Championship by year – Wheelchair men's doubles